Sarah Onuora is a Canadian rheumatologist and the chief editor of Nature Reviews Rheumatology.

Education 

Onuora has a bachelor's degree in biology from McMaster University, Canada.

Career 
In 2005 she worked in the editorial department of Rheumatology journal and she joined Nature Publishing in 2007, initially working on Nature Reviews Neurology before becoming a senior editor at Nature Reviews Rheumatology. She became the chief editor of Nature Reviews Rheumatology in 2015.

Selected publications 

 New insights into RA genetics from GWAS meta-analysis, Nature Reviews Rheumatology, 17, 128 (2021). https://doi.org/10.1038/s41584-021-00580-8

References

External links 

 Publications on Pub Med

Living people
Academic journal editors
McMaster University alumni
Canadian rheumatologists
Year of birth missing (living people)
Women rheumatologists
21st-century Canadian physicians
21st-century women physicians
Canadian women physicians